Gemma di Vergy is an 1834 tragedia lirica (tragic opera) in two acts by Gaetano Donizetti from a libretto by Giovanni Emanuele Bidera. It is based on the tragedy Charles VII chez ses grands vassaux (Charles VII and His Chief Vassals) (1831) by Alexandre Dumas père, which was later to become the subject of the opera The Saracen by the Russian composer César Cui.

The heroine is the childless wife of the Count of Vergy, and the plot deals with her jealousy and grief as her husband arranges an annulment of their marriage in preparation for the arrival of his new bride, Ida, and her despair following the murder of her husband by a slave, Tamas, who is secretly in love with her.

Gemma di Vergy was first performed on 26 December 1834 at the La Scala, Milan. The leading role was taken by the Italian soprano Giuseppina Ronzi de Begnis, Donizetti's favourite prima donna at the time, for whom he had previously composed Fausta (1832 ), and for whom he was later to compose Roberto Devereux (1837).

Performance history
The opera remained very popular in Italy until at least the 1860s. It was not performed at the Teatro di San Carlo in Naples until 4 March 1837, but it remained popular there and appeared every year until 1848. Productions were also staged in London on 12 March 1842, Paris, New York City on 2 October 1843, Lisbon, St. Petersburg, Vienna and Barcelona. While initially popular, it had disappeared from the repertoire by about 1900, although before its 20th-century revivals, it was staged in Empoli in 1901.

Gemma di Vergy was revived for the soprano Montserrat Caballé in a production at the Teatro San Carlo in Naples in December 1975. Subsequently, the same soprano performed the work in concert in several other cities. A number of live recordings exist of the Caballé performances from Naples, Paris and New York.

Roles

Recordings

References
Notes

Cited sources
Ashbrook, William (1982), Donizetti and His Operas, Cambridge University Press.  
Ashbrook, William and Sarah Hibberd (2001), in  Holden, Amanda (Ed.), The New Penguin Opera Guide, New York: Penguin Putnam. .  pp. 224–47.
Black, John (1982), Donizetti’s Operas in Naples, 1822–1848. London: The Donizetti Society.

Other sources
Allitt, John Stewart (1991), Donizetti: in the light of Romanticism and the teaching of Johann Simon Mayr, Shaftesbury: Element Books, Ltd (UK); Rockport, MA: Element, Inc.(USA)
Ashbrook, William  (1998), "Gemma di Vergy" in Stanley Sadie  (Ed.),  The New Grove Dictionary of Opera, Vol. Two, p. 373. London: Macmillan Publishers, Inc.  
Loewenberg, Alfred (1970). Annals of Opera, 1597-1940, 2nd edition.  Rowman and Littlefield
Osborne, Charles, (1994),  The Bel Canto Operas of Rossini, Donizetti, and Bellini,  Portland, Oregon: Amadeus Press. 
Sadie, Stanley, (Ed.); John Tyrell (Exec. Ed.) (2004), The New Grove Dictionary of Music and Musicians.  2nd edition. London: Macmillan.    (hardcover).   (eBook).
Weinstock, Herbert (1963), Donizetti and the World of Opera in Italy, Paris, and Vienna in the First Half of the Nineteenth Century, New York: Pantheon Books.

External links
  Donizetti Society (London) website
 Libretto (Italian)

Operas by Gaetano Donizetti
Italian-language operas
Operas
1834 operas
Opera world premieres at La Scala
Operas based on plays
Operas based on works by Alexandre Dumas